Brâncovenești (formerly Ieciu and Delavrancea; , Hungarian pronunciation:  or Vécs) is a commune in Mureș County, Transylvania, Romania.

The commune is composed of five villages: Brâncovenești, Idicel (Idecspatak), Idicel-Pădure (Erdőidecs), Săcalu de Pădure (Erdőszakál) and Vălenii de Mureș (Disznajó).

Brâncovenești is the site of the Kemény Castle, which was the only castle in Transylvania to survive the Mongol Invasion of Hungary in 1241–42. At the time, it was referred to as Vécs, and it guarded the salt mines of Gömör.

See also 
 List of Hungarian exonyms (Mureș County)

References

Communes in Mureș County
Localities in Transylvania
Székely communities